Sela pri Dragatušu (in older sources also Sela pri Turnu) is a settlement north of Dragatuš in the Municipality of Črnomelj in the White Carniola area of southeastern Slovenia. The area is part of the traditional region of Lower Carniola and is now included in the Southeast Slovenia Statistical Region.

References

External links
Sela pri Dragatušu on Geopedia

Populated places in the Municipality of Črnomelj